Trevor Peres (born July 25, 1969) is an American heavy metal musician best known as the rhythm guitarist, songwriter and one of the founding members of the death metal band Obituary.

Bands
Obituary (1984 onward)
Meathook Seed (1993)
Catastrophic (2001 onward)

Discography

Obituary
Raging Death (1987)
Slowly We Rot (1989)
Cause of Death (1990)
The End Complete (1992)
World Demise (1994)
Don't Care (EP) (1994)
Back from the Dead (1997)
Dead (Live Album) (1998)
Anthology (Compilation Album) (2001)
Frozen in Time (2005)
Frozen Alive (Live DVD) (2006)
Xecutioner's Return (2007)
Left to Die (EP) (2008)
Live Xecution - Party San 2008 (DVD) (2009)
Darkest Day (2009)
Inked in Blood (2014)
Obituary (2017)

Meathook Seed
Embedded (1993)

Catastrophic
The Cleansing (2001)

Necro
The Pre-Fix for Death (2004)

Holy Moses
Agony of Death (2008)

External links
Official Obituary Website
Official Obituary MySpace Profile

References

1969 births
20th-century American guitarists
American heavy metal guitarists
Living people
Obituary (band) members
Rhythm guitarists